An election was held on November 3, 2020, to elect all 110 members to Michigan's House of Representatives. The election coincided with elections for other offices, including U.S. President, U.S. Senate, and U.S. House of Representatives. Michigan Republican Party retained control of the chamber.

Background 
In the 2018 Michigan House of Representatives election, the Michigan Republican Party narrowly retained their majority on the chamber.

Despite the COVID-19 pandemic, elections proceeded as planned, though with a larger number of mail-in ballots than usual.

In October 2020, The Washington Post identified this state election as one of eight whose outcomes could affect partisan balance during post-census redistricting.

Term-limited members 
Under the Michigan Constitution, members of the state Senate can only serve two four-year terms, and members of the House of Representatives are limited to three two-year terms, some of the toughest term-limit laws in the country.

Democrats 

 LaTanya Garrett
 Wendell Byrd
Vanessa Guerra

Republicans 

 Kathy Crawford
 Larry C. Inman

Marginal districts 
The following districts would be considered marginal seats.

Republican-held targets 
These Republican-held districts were the most vulnerable to Democratic challengers.

Democratic-held targets 
These Democratic districts were the most vulnerable to Republican challengers.

Predictions

Close races
Seats where the margin of victory was under 10%:
  
  (gain)
 
  (gain)
 
 
 
  
 
 
  (gain)
 
 
  (gain)

Results by district

District 1 
In the 1st district Democratic incumbent Tenisha Yancey won her primary unopposed on August 4. On November 3, Yancey defeated the Republican nominee, Latricia Ann Lanier, in the general election.

District 2 
In the 2nd district, Joe Tate won re-election.

District 3 
Incumbent Democrat Wendell Byrd stood down in the 3rd district due to term limits.

District 4 
Incumbent representative Isaac Robinson died in March 2020 of a suspected COVID-19 infection. Twelve Democrats ran to succeed him, but Abraham Aiyash was elected as the Democratic nominee for the seat. On November 3, Aiyash defeated the Republican nominee Howard Weathington in the general election.

District 5 
In the 5th district, Cynthia A. Johnson faced two Democratic challengers in the primary. Jermaine Tobey and Rita Ross, the sister of singer Diana Ross. Johnson won her primary and won against Republican nominee Harold Day in the general election.

District 6 
In the 6th district, Democrat Tyrone Carter is running for re-election in the general election unopposed. He won his primary election, beating challengers Ivy Nichole Neal and David Palmer. There was no Republican Primary held.

District 7 
Incumbent Democrat LaTanya Garrett stood down in the 7th district due to term limits. Helena Scott was the Democratic nominee and Ronald Cole was the Republican nominee. On November 3, Scott defeated Cole in the general election.

District 8 
Incumbent Democrat Sherry Gay-Dagnogo did not run in the primary, instead running to be on the Detroit school board. Democrat Stephanie Young was elected as the Democratic nominee in the 8th district. On November 3, Young defeated Republican nominee Miroslawa Teresa Gorak in the general election.

District 9
In the 9th district, Democrat Karen Whitsett won re-election.

District 10
In the 10th district, incumbent Democrat Leslie Love was unable to run for re-election due to term limits.

District 11
In the 11th district, incumbent Democrat Jewell Jones won re-election.

District 12
In the 12th district, incumbent Democrat Alex Garza won re-election.

District 13
In the 13th district, incumbent Democrat Frank Liberati was unable to run for re-election due to term limits.

District 14
In the 14th district, incumbent Democrat Cara Clemente won re-election.

District 15

District 16

District 17

District 18

District 19 
In the 19th district, Democrat Laurie Pohutsky ran for re-election. Her Republican opponent was Martha Ptashnik. Pohutsky narrowly won re-election

District 20

District 21

District 22

District 23 
In the 23rd district, Democrat Darrin Camilleri won re-election. He was challenged by Republican nominee John Poe.

District 24

District 25 
In the 25th district, Democrat Nate Shannon won re-election. His Republican opponent was Paul Smith.

District 26

District 27

District 28

District 29

District 30

District 31

District 32

District 33

District 34

District 35

District 36

District 37

District 38
In the 38th district, incumbent Republican Kathy Crawford was prevented from running for re-election due to term limits. Kelly Breen was elected as a Democrat in this Republican district.

District 39 
In the 39th district, incumbent Republican Ryan Berman won re-election.

Generic Democrat vs Generic Republican

District 40

District 41

District 42

District 43

District 44

District 45 
In the 45th district, incumbent Republican Michael Webber could not run for re-election due to term-limits.

District 46

District 47

District 48

District 49

District 50

District 51 
On August 4, 2020, the primary elections occurred. Incumbent Republican Mike Mueller ran unopposed. Brad May, a mental health clinician, was nominated on the Democratic ticket.  In the primary, May defeated Conner Wallace.  Wallace later endorsed May's candidacy.

On September 18, 2020, the Michigan Republican Party pointed to May's criminal record, which included conviction for robbery, possession of cocaine, and retail fraud. The state Republican Party criticized the Michigan Education Association for endorsing him, despite his criminal past. May responded to these allegations. He confirmed that they were true, but also claimed that he had made significant improvements to his life since his convictions, and that through his work as a clinician, has been able to help those who had been in a similar position to himself.

In the general election on November 3, 2020, Mueller was re-elected, defeating May.

District 52

District 53

District 54

District 55

District 56

District 57

District 58

District 59

District 60

District 61 
Incumbent Republican Brandt Iden was term limited, which made the 61st district an open seat. The primaries occurred on August 4 and decided that Republican nominee Bronwyn Haltom was to run against incumbent Kalamazoo County Commissioner, Christine Morse, as the Democratic nominee. Morse won the seat.

Generic Democrat vs Generic Republican

District 62 
Incumbent Democrat Jim Haadsma won re-election in the 62nd district against Republican nominee Dave Morgan.

District 63

District 64

District 65

District 66 
In the 66th district, Republican Beth Griffin won reelection.

District 67

District 68

District 69

District 70

District 71
In Michigan's 71st House of Representatives district, Democrat Angela Witwer was re-elected.

District 72

District 73

District 74

District 75

District 76

District 77

District 78

District 79 
In the 79th district Pauline Wendzel won re-election.

District 80

District 81

District 82

District 83

District 84

District 85

District 86

District 87

District 88

District 89

District 90

District 91

District 92

District 93

District 94

District 95

District 96

District 97

District 98

District 99

District 100

District 101

District 102

District 103

District 104 
In the 104th district, incumbent Republican Larry Inman did not run for re-election due to term limits. District 104 was the number 1 target for the Democrats but was retained for the GOP by John Roth.

District 105

District 106

District 107

District 108

District 109

District 110
Gregory Markkanen was re-elected in the 110th district.

See also
 2020 Michigan elections
 2020 United States state legislative elections

Notes 

Partisan clients

References

External links
 
 
  (State affiliate of the U.S. League of Women Voters)
 

2020 Michigan elections
Michigan House
Michigan House of Representatives elections
November 2020 events in the United States